Rosa is a children's picture book written by poet, activist, and educator Nikki Giovanni and illustrated by Bryan Collier. A biography of African-American civil rights activist Rosa Parks, it was adapted to film in 2007 by Weston Woods Studios, Inc., narrated by the author.

Giovanni was the first recipient of the Southern Poverty Law Center's Rosa L. Parks Woman of Courage Award and knew Parks personally through their involvement in civil rights activism. Rosa was published in October 2005, as a celebration of the 50th anniversary of Rosa Parks' historic arrest and the Montgomery bus boycott.  Parks died of natural causes later that month at the age of 92.

Awards
Rosa won the Coretta Scott King Award for Illustrators  and was a Caldecott Honor Book in 2006.

References

2005 children's books
Civil rights movement in popular culture
American picture books
Biographies about African-American people
Books about African-American history
Caldecott Honor-winning works
Children's history books
Cultural depictions of activists
Montgomery bus boycott
Coretta Scott King Award-winning works